This is a list of the prime ministers of the Commonwealth of Nations in order of appointment.

List

See also 
 List of prime ministers of Elizabeth II
 List of prime ministers of Charles III

Commonwealth prime ministers
Prime Ministers